The 2006–07 Jackson State Tigers basketball team represented Jackson State University in the 1999–2000 NCAA Division I men's basketball season. The Tigers, led by 11th-year head coach Tevester Anderson, played their home games at the Williams Assembly Center in Jackson, Mississippi as members of the Southwestern Athletic Conference. After finishing the conference regular season tied for second in the standings, Jackson State won the SWAC tournament to receive an automatic bid to the NCAA tournament. As No. 16 seed in the Midwest region, the Tigers were beaten by No. 1 seed and eventual National champion Florida in the opening round.

To date, this is the most recent appearance in the NCAA Tournament for the Jackson State basketball program.

Roster

Schedule and results 

|-
!colspan=12 style=| Non-conference regular season

|-
!colspan=12 style=| SWAC regular season

|-
!colspan=12 style=| SWAC tournament

|-
!colspan=12 style=| NCAA tournament

Sources

Awards and honors
Trey Johnson  SWAC Player of the Year

References

Jackson State Tigers basketball seasons
Jackson State Tigers
Jackson State
Jackson State Tigers basketball
Jackson State Tigers basketball